"Love Me like You Do" is a 2015 song by Ellie Goulding.

Love Me like You Do may also refer to:
 "Love Me like You Do" (1986), the B-side to Roger Daltrey's single "Quicksilver Lightning"
 "Love Me like You Do" (1987), a song from Anita Pointer's album Love for What It Is
 "Love Me like You Do" (2012), a bonus track from Justin Bieber's album Believe
 Love Me like You Do (2014), the British release title of the film Jackie & Ryan

See also
 "Love Me like You", a 2015 song by Little Mix